Edward Bruce is a British executive music producer, record executive, and businessman. In 2017, he received a Gold certification award in France and Belgium for his contribution to Loïc Nottet’s Selfocracy album which was a  Sony/Jive Epic release. He also won the Platinum certification award in Belgium for his contribution.

Early life and career
Edward Bruce was born in 1997 in Aberdeen, the United Kingdom where he lived until 2015 and then moved to Glasgow to pursue higher education. He studied Computing Science at the University of Glasgow.

In 2017, he gained platinum for the Belgian album sales and Gold in France and Belgian album sales certifications on major label releases to IMPALA certifications for his own label. He has been credited as the executive producer on releases from Shogun and Dizzee Rascal and contributed towards several sessions with Red Bull Music and Sony/RCA Records the UK.

References

Living people
1997 births
British record producers
People from Aberdeen
Alumni of the University of Glasgow